KaOS is a desktop Linux distribution that features the latest version of the KDE desktop environment, the LibreOffice office suite, and other popular software applications that use the Qt toolkit.

History 
The first version of KaOS was released as "KdeOS" in 2013. To prevent confusion between the distribution's name and the desktop environment KDE, the name was changed to "KaOS" in September 2013.

Features 
KaOS is distributed via an ISO image, and exclusively supports 64-bit x86 processors.

KaOS is a desktop rolling release, built from scratch with a very specific focus. The focus on one desktop environment (KDE Plasma 5), one toolkit (Qt), one architecture (x86_64), with an emphasis on evaluating and selecting the most suitable tools and applications.

Applications
The default applications include:

Reception 
Phoronix wrote in 2016, "Overall, I was quite pleased with it for being a niche distribution. KaOS was easy to install and was quickly running on a bleeding-edge KDE Plasma 5 stack. Overall, it was a fun and pleasant few hours spent with KaOS."

FossMint stated in 2017, that KaOS "is a modern, open-source, beautifully designed, QT and KDE-focused Linux distro. It is a rolling release that ships with KDE Plasma as its default Desktop Environment, uses Pacman as its package manager, and has a 3-group structure repository on GitHub." and "The fact that it is a rolling release means that you will never need to worry about future updates the moment you have a version installed like in the case of Ubuntu and the like where you would need to consider whether to perform a clean installation of another “major version” or not."

Hectic Geek reviewed KaOS in 2014, and wrote that the distribution was not very fast, but included all necessary applications.

Jesse Smith from DistroWatch Weekly wrote a review of KaOS 2014.04. Smith said the features of KaOS worked well.

Robert Rijkhoff reviewed KaOS 2017.09 for DistroWatch Weekly, and he said that "KaOS seems to be trying a little bit hard to be different".

ZDNet wrote a hands-on review about KaOS 2014.06:

Dedoimedo reviewed KaOS 2014.12:

Jack Wallen from Linux.com stated his opinion about KaOS in 2016, and said that the distribution is beautiful.

References

External links 

 
 KaOS Forum
 
 KaOS in OpenSourceFeed gallery

Pacman-based Linux distributions
Rolling Release Linux distributions
x86-64 Linux distributions
Linux distributions
Independent Linux distributions